Geyser Pass is a mountain pass in the La Sal Range of Utah.  The  pass is not named after a geyser, but for cattleman Al Geyser, who grazed his stock in the area in the 1880s.

See also
 List of mountain passes

References

Mountain passes of Utah
Landforms of San Juan County, Utah
Manti-La Sal National Forest